The 18th Quebec Legislature is the provincial legislature that existed in Quebec, Canada from August 24, 1931, to October 30, 1935. The Liberal Party led by Louis-Alexandre Taschereau had a majority of seats in the Legislative Assembly of Quebec and remained in power in the government.

Seats per political party

 After the 1931 elections

Member list

This was the list of members of the Legislative Assembly of Quebec that were elected in the 1931 election:

Other elected MLAs

Other MLAs were elected in by-elections during the term

 Alexandre Gaudet, Liberal Party, Nicolet, November 7, 1933 
 Thomas Hercule Lapointe, Liberal Party, Wolfe, November 14, 1933 
 Joseph-Théodule Rhéaume, Liberal Party, Jacques-Cartier, November 21, 1933

Cabinet Ministers

 Prime Minister and Executive Council President: Louis-Alexandre Taschereau
 Agriculture: Adélard Godbout
 Colonization, Hunting and Fishing: Hector Laferté (1931-1934)
 Public Works and Labor: Joseph-Napoléon Francoeur (1931)
 Labour: Charles-Joseph Arcand (1931-1935)
 Colonization: Irénée Vautrin (1934-1935)
 Public Works, Hunting and Fishing: Joseph-Napoléon Francoeur (1934-1935)
 Public Works: Joseph-Napoléon Francoeur (1931-1934) 
 Mines:Joseph-Édouard Perrault 
 Lands and Forests: Honoré Mercier Jr 
 Roads: Joseph-Édouard Perrault 
 Municipal Affairs: Louis-Alexandre Taschereau (1931-1935)
 Municipal Affairs, Industry and Commerce: Télesphore-Damien Bouchard (1935)
 Attorney General: Louis-Alexandre Taschereau 
 Provincial secretary: Athanase David 
 Treasurer: Louis-Alexandre Taschereau (1931-1932), Ralph Frederick Stockwell (1932-1935)
 Members without portfolios: George Bryson Jr. (1931-1935), Irénée Vautrin (1934), John Hall Kelly (1935)

Notes and references

 1931 election results
 List of historical Cabinet Ministers

18